Psychrobacter maritimus is a Gram-negative, aerobic oxidase- and catalase-positive, nonpigmented, non-spore-forming, nonmotile bacterium of the genus  Psychrobacter, which was isolated from coastal sea ice and sediments of the Sea of Japan and in Russia.

References

External links
Type strain of Psychrobacter maritimus at BacDive -  the Bacterial Diversity Metadatabase

Moraxellaceae
Bacteria described in 2004